Kain Massin is an Australian writer of speculative fiction.

Biography
Massin is based in Adelaide, South Australia where he is a high school maths and science teacher. He is also a member of the Blackwood Writers Group. Massin's first work was published in 1998 with his short story "Escape from Stalingrad" which was featured in fourth edition of Harbinger. "Escape from Stalingrad" was nominated for the 1999 Aurealis Award for best horror short story but lost to Sean Williams and Simon Brown's "Atrax". In 2008 Massin's first novel was published by ABC Books, entitled God for the Killing, after he won the 2008 ABC Fiction Award which has a A$10,000 prize and a publication deal for the novel.

Awards and nominations

Bibliography

Anthologies
As editor
Tales from the Black Wood (2006, co-editor)

Novels
God for the Killing (2008)

Short stories
"Escape from Stalingrad" (1998) in Harbinger #4
"Wrong Dreaming" (2000) in On Spec Fall 2000 (ed. Jena Snyder)
"A Guide for the Grave-Robber" (2000) in Altair #5 (ed. Robert N. Stephenson, Jim Deed, Andrew Collings)

References
General

Specific

External links
Official site

21st-century Australian novelists
Australian male novelists
Australian male short story writers
Living people
Year of birth missing (living people)
21st-century Australian short story writers
21st-century Australian male writers